Paul M. Torkelson (born July 12, 1952) is an American politician serving as a member of the Minnesota House of Representatives since 2009. A member of the Republican Party of Minnesota, Torkelson represents District 15B in southwestern Minnesota, which includes the city of New Ulm and all or parts of Blue Earth, Brown, and Redwood Counties.

Early life, education and career
Torkelson earned a Bachelor of Arts degree in instrumental music education from Gustavus Adolphus College in 1974.

In 2006, Governor Tim Pawlenty appointed Torkelson to the Minnesota Governor's Clean Water Council, a position he held until his election to the House. He is a member of the Minnesota's Deer Hunters Association, a former vice president of the Minnesota Farm Bureau, and a former chair of St. James Health Services.

Torkelson is a fourth-generation Watonwan County corn, soybean and pork farmer, with family roots in the area since 1878, and a former music teacher.

Minnesota House of Representatives 
Torkelson was elected to the Minnesota House of Representatives in 2008, succeeding incumbent Representative Brad Finstad, who decided not to seek reelection, and has been reelected every two years since.

Torkelson was an assistant majority leader during the 2011-12 legislative session and an assistant minority leader from 2013-14. He chaired the Capital Investment Committee in 2015-16, and the Transportation Finance Committee in 2017-18. During the 2021-22 legislative session, Torkelson again served as an assistant majority leader. After the 2022 election, he was appointed to serve as deputy minority leader by incoming Minority Leader Lisa Demuth. Torkelson is also the minority lead on the Elections Finance and Policy Committee and Ethics Committees and sits on the Rules and Legislative Administration Committee.

Electoral history

References

External links 

 Rep. Torkelson Web Page
 Project Votesmart – Rep. Paul Torkelson Profile
 Paul Torkelson Campaign Web Site

1952 births
Living people
People from Brown County, Minnesota
Gustavus Adolphus College alumni
Republican Party members of the Minnesota House of Representatives
American Lutherans
21st-century American politicians